Freie Universität (Thielplatz) is a Berlin U-Bahn station located in the Dahlem district on the . It is one of two main stations to reach the nearby Freie Universität Berlin and the Fritz Haber Institute of the Max Planck Society. It was opened on 12 October 1913 (designed by H.Straumer) and until 1929 was the southwestern terminus of the line. In 1980, a second entrance was built. In December 2016 the station was renamed from "Thielplatz" to "Freie Universität (Thielplatz)"

References

U3 (Berlin U-Bahn) stations
Railway stations in Germany opened in 1913
Buildings and structures in Steglitz-Zehlendorf